Steleops is a genus of common barklice in the family Psocidae. There are more than 20 described species in Steleops.

Species
These 24 species belong to the genus Steleops:

 Steleops albertonetoi Gonzalez Obando, Garcia Aldrete & Carrejo, 2011
 Steleops barrerai Garcia Aldrete, 1995
 Steleops buitrerensis Gonzalez Obando, Garcia Aldrete & Carrejo, 2011
 Steleops cashiriariensis Gonzalez Obando, Garcia Aldrete & Carrejo, 2011
 Steleops chamelaensis Gonzalez Obando, Garcia Aldrete & Carrejo, 2011
 Steleops conipata Garcia Aldrete & Menchaca Lopez, 1982
 Steleops cuzcoensis Gonzalez Obando, Garcia Aldrete & Carrejo, 2011
 Steleops elegans (Banks, 1904)
 Steleops lichenatus (Walsh, 1863)
 Steleops machupicchuensis Gonzalez Obando, Garcia Aldrete & Carrejo, 2011
 Steleops maculatus New, 1972
 Steleops manizalensis Gonzalez Obando, Garcia Aldrete & Carrejo, 2011
 Steleops mendivili Gonzalez Obando, Garcia Aldrete & Carrejo, 2011
 Steleops monticola Garcia Aldrete, 1981
 Steleops ortegae Garcia Aldrete, 1995
 Steleops pedunculatus (Enderlein, 1910)
 Steleops plenitudensis Gonzalez Obando, Garcia Aldrete & Carrejo, 2011
 Steleops pulcher New, 1972
 Steleops punctipennis Enderlein, 1910
 Steleops purus Mockford, 1996
 Steleops rioblancoensis Gonzalez Obando, Garcia Aldrete & Carrejo, 2011
 Steleops tambopata Garcia Aldrete, 1995
 Steleops thorntoni Gonzalez Obando, Garcia Aldrete & Carrejo, 2011
 Steleops wygodzinskyi Mockford, 1996

References

Psocidae
Articles created by Qbugbot